Edwyn Hoskyns may refer to:
Sir Edwyn Hoskyns, 12th Baronet (1851–1925), British Anglican bishop, Bishop of Southwell, 1904–1925
Sir Edwyn Hoskyns, 13th Baronet (1884–1937), British Anglican priest and theologian, son of the above
Sir Edwyn Wren Hoskyns, 17th Baronet (1956–2015), British paediatrician, great-grandson of the above